Elizabeth Brooks may refer to:

 Elisabeth Brooks (1951–1997), Canadian actress
 Elizabeth Carter Brooks (1867–1951), African American educator, social activist and architect

See also
 Elizabeth Brooke (disambiguation)